José de Castro y Orozco (1808 in Granada – 1869 in Madrid) was a Spanish politician, poet and playwright whose literary work is associated with the Romantic movement.

1808 births
1869 deaths
Spanish male dramatists and playwrights
19th-century Spanish poets
Justice ministers of Spain
Spanish male poets
19th-century Spanish dramatists and playwrights
19th-century male writers